Lego DC Super-Villains is a Lego-themed action-adventure platform video game developed by Traveller's Tales. The fourth installment in the Lego Batman series of games, it is a spin-off that focuses entirely on villains of the DC Universe; it is the first in the series to do so since the villain levels from Lego Batman: The Videogame. The game was released by Warner Bros. Interactive Entertainment on 16 October 2018 in North America and 19 October worldwide. The macOS version of the game was released by Feral Interactive on 30 July 2019.

While the core gameplay follows the same style of past Lego titles, including the addition of a two-player cooperative multiplayer mode, DC Super-Villains is the first title to incorporate a customized character into the story. The plot centers around the villains of the DC Universe who, in the aftermath of the Justice League's disappearance, reluctantly take on the role of the Earth's protectors and must defeat a rival group of supervillains from another universe, who are masquerading as heroes while searching for a powerful item for their master.

Gameplay
Lego DC Super-Villains is an action-adventure game played from a third-person perspective, alternating between various action-adventure sequences and puzzle-solving scenarios.

Characters
Like previous titles from the Lego Batman trilogy, such as DC Super Heroes and Beyond Gotham, players gain access to a roster of iconic characters from the DC Universe, each with their own unique abilities. Lego DC Super-Villains stands out from other Lego video games by being the first to incorporate the use of a custom character, who becomes integrated with the game's story. Initially players devise their looks, name, and style of fighting, but gain access to super-powers for their character to use as they progress in the story, along with unlocking customisation options.

Setting
The game itself operates with the same level of gameplay mechanics from previous Lego video games, as well as elements from the Lego Batman trilogy, focusing on a mixture of levels consisting of two modes – story and free roam – along with open-world elements in between levels, featuring a selection of locations from the DC Universe, including condensed versions of Gotham City and Metropolis, as well as Smallville, Arkham Asylum, Apokolips, the Justice League Watchtower, Stryker's Island, the Hall of Justice, S.T.A.R. Labs, and Belle Reve; story levels feature other locations such as Gorilla City, Oa, Themyscira, and Nanda Parbat.

Downloadable content
The game features a Deluxe Edition, which grants players who purchase it access to season pass content. The season pass consists of levels based on other DC media franchises – two based on the 2018 film Aquaman, one based on the 1993 animated film Batman: Mask of the Phantasm, two based on the 2019 film Shazam!, and one based on the 2013 Young Justice animated series episode "Summit". It also contains character packs, including the "DC Super Heroes: TV Series DLC Character Pack" and "DC Super-Villains: TV Series DLC Character Pack", both consisting of characters from The CW's "Arrowverse" television programs; the "Justice League Dark Character Pack"; and the "DC Movies Character Pack", a pack consisting of characters from the DC Extended Universe.

Plot
Following the capture of a super-powered individual dubbed "The Rookie", Commissioner Gordon oversees their transfer to Stryker's Island in Metropolis. As the Rookie possesses a previously-unseen ability to absorb energy to gain new super-powers, Gordon offers the incarcerated Lex Luthor a reduced prison sentence in exchange for monitoring them and assessing their potential threat. Before he can agree to the deal, Luthor's bodyguard Mercy Graves arrives to break him and the Rookie out of prison, and the trio escape alongside several other imprisoned villains, though they are pursued by the Justice League. Meanwhile, the Joker and Harley Quinn steal several items from Wayne Tech, with Batman giving chase. The combined group of villains are defeated by the sudden arrival of the "Justice Syndicate", a superhero team from a parallel universe, with only a few escaping. Before departing, Harley witnesses the Syndicate forcibly warp the Justice League away.

The Syndicate claim that the Justice League are on an off-world mission and that they are their replacements, with the group's leader Ultraman posing as reporter Kent Clarkson to feed further false information to the public. Suspicious of the Syndicate, Luthor begins uniting a massive force of villains to expose the truth and defeat the Syndicate so that they might take over. Lois Lane and Jimmy Olsen also begin their own independent investigation. During their research, the villains discover the Justice Syndicate is actually the "Crime Syndicate", who are the Justice League's villainous counterparts from Earth-3, and that they are searching for something on Earth, using their superhero personas to gain easy access to classified information and locations. Once a large enough group has been assembled, the united Legion of Doom launch an attack on the Crime Syndicate on top of LexCorp, but Luthor betrays everyone, planning to use the Syndicate's technology to be rid of them all in order to rule the Earth alone. Furious at Luthor's betrayal, the Rookie tries to stop him by blasting the machine with energy, causing it to malfunction; inadvertently bringing Apokolips near Earth and teleporting everyone present to random locations.

As the Syndicate tries to maintain order on Earth, the Joker, Harley and the Rookie find themselves on Apokolips and encounter Darkseid, the Syndicate's secret master who ordered them to search Earth for the last piece of the Anti-Life Equation. As Darkseid discovers them, the villains are rescued by the Justice League, who have just escaped their imprisonment on Apokolips. Escaping Darkseid's forces, the group learn the Syndicate has fooled the people of Earth into believing the Justice League have become evil, prompting the League to form an uneasy alliance with the Legion of Doom to defeat them.

After gathering more forces, the alliance tricks Johnny Quick into revealing the Syndicate's plans on camera. Lois broadcasts the footage worldwide, turning the public against the Syndicate. Upon defeating and sending the Syndicate back to Earth-3, the alliance focus on finding the last piece of the Equation. Batman soon discovers it to have been inside a Mother Box that Harley stole from Wayne Tech, until the Rookie inadvertently absorbed it while sending the Crime Syndicate back to Earth-3. Learning that Darkseid is sending his forces to Earth to track it down, the alliance attempts to protect the Rookie, but they are captured and taken to Apokolips, forcing the League and the Legion to mount a rescue mission. Though the Rookie is rescued, Darkseid absorbs the last piece of the Equation. However, it proves ineffective as it was altered by the physiology of the Rookie, who is now revealed to hail from Earth-3. The Rookie then uses the Anti-Life Equation to defeat Darkseid and alter his and his forces' psyches, making them kind. Though Luthor attempts to abandon them again and take over Earth, the alliance manages to restore Apokolips to its original location and return home. The Rookie is then given the chance to join the Justice League as a superhero, or to continue working for the Legion of Doom as a supervillain; the choice made is left up to the player.

If the player chooses to join the Justice League, Luthor will express disappointment at the Rookie for betraying him even though the Joker reminds Luthor that he tried to send the Rookie to the other side of the universe twice. Livewire then uses her ability to blind the Justice League and the Rookie so the villains can make their escape. The Rookie then joins the Justice League to chase down the villains.

If the player decides to join The Legion of Doom, the Joker suggests that the Rookie become their new leader as Luthor can no longer be trusted. The Rookie then teleports the villains away with Batman stating that he hates it when he's right. The Legion is then teleported to safety so they can resume their criminal activities.

In a post-credits scene, the angry Anti-Monitor arrives on Apokolips to find all its occupants still under the effect of the Rookie's powers, and proceeds to attack Darkseid, having been disgusted by his kindness.

Development
The game was leaked by Walmart Canada in May 2018. Warner Bros. Interactive Entertainment announced the title officially on 30 May 2018. Game director Arthur Parsons revealed that the concept of a super villain themed game dates back in 2008's Lego Batman: The Videogame, with featured levels based on a villain's point of view of the story.

Voice acting
The game's voice work is directed by Liam O'Brien, where this marks the first Lego game since Lego Dimensions to have original voice acting utilised by actors who are affiliated with the Screen Actors Guild‐American Federation of Television and Radio Artists (SAG-AFTRA) following the conclusion of the 2016–17 video game voice actor strike. Parsons has stated that the game utilises an "All-Star" voice cast, where he describes his excitement on the game's cast as the best one that he has ever worked on in any Lego game that the company has ever done. Like Lego Batman 3: Beyond Gotham, the cast consists of a number of various actors reprising roles from various DC properties, Noticeable additions to the game's cast includes of Michael Ironside reprising his role as Darkseid for the first time since the Justice League Unlimited series finale "Destroyer", which aired in 2006, Zachary Levi reprising his role as the titular character from the Shazam! film to coincide the release the Shazam! DLC packs, and Greg Miller providing the voice of Polka-Dot Man.

Reception

The Nintendo Switch and PC versions received "generally favorable" reviews, while the PlayStation 4 and Xbox One versions received "mixed or average" reviews, according to Metacritic. Reviewers praised the game's story, humor, and voice acting.

Accolades

References

External links
 Official website 

2018 video games
DC Super-Villains
Action-adventure games
Crossover video games
Nintendo Switch games
Open-world video games
PlayStation 4 games
Sentient toys in fiction
Superhero crossover video games
Traveller's Tales games
Video games developed in the United Kingdom
Video game spin-offs
Warner Bros. video games
Windows games
Xbox One games
Video games with alternate endings
Lego Batman
Video games set in Africa
Video games set in Asia
Video games set in Kansas
Video games set in the United States
Video games set on fictional islands
Video games set on fictional planets
Video games set in Louisiana
Video games set in prison
Video games set in psychiatric hospitals
Video games with customizable avatars
3D platform games
Video games scored by Simon Withenshaw
Video games scored by Ian Livingstone
Feral Interactive games
Multiplayer and single-player video games
Video games based on DC Comics